Etta Britt (Melissa Prewitt, born Lancaster, Kentucky) is a Nashville-based R&B, soul and blues vocalist. Successful and sought after in the role of supporting artist, in 2012, Britt was approached by songwriter Sandy Knox (Reba McEntire) and music industry executive, Katie Gillon, to be the first artist to sign with Wrinkled Records as a featured artist.

Early life

The Prewitt family (Arthor, Amanda and Melissa's seven siblings), moved from Lancaster, Kentucky to Louisville, Kentucky when Melissa  was in the second grade, Melissa was raised in Louisville and attended Fern Creek High School. While away at sixth grade camp, Melissa won the talent competition, marking the point in her life when she knew she wanted to perform.

Pet-named Etta by her sister, who in return, is pet-named Myrna, the origin of these names is obscured or forgotten. Melissa started singing in the fourth grade, her sister, a cousin, and a friend sang in a gospel quartet and performed for local church-groups. As a young girl singing along with The Supremes, Melissa aspired to be more like Mary Wilson rather than Diana Ross because she loved singing harmonies.

Career

Melissa (at the time credited as Melissa Dean), approached Dave Roland (of Dave & Sugar) for an audition with the band and replaced the departing Vicki Hackeman in January 1979. During Melissa's tenure with Dave & Sugar (1979 to 1984), the band toured with headline acts that included: Kenny Rogers, Dottie West, Tammy Wynette, Gallagher and Conway Twitty. Melissa is credited on four Dave & Sugar albums including the Billboard Magazine Country Singles #1 hit, "Golden Tears". Additional trips to the Top 10, Country Singles chart, include: "My World Begins And Ends With You" #4, "Stay With Me" #6 and "Why Did You Have To Be So Good" #4.  The group had continued success with eight additional Country Singles chart hits from 1980 through 1982.

In 1984, Melissa was residing in Nashville, Tennessee and married to studio guitarist Bob Britt, the couple soon had two daughters to support. No longer with the defunct Dave & Sugar trio, Melissa (Britt) took work waiting tables and cleaning houses while securing her real estate credentials, she also explored songwriting and singing as much as circumstances would permit. Bob Britt's reputation as a guitarist was growing, credited on Leon Russell's, Solid State (1984), he toured with The Dixie Chicks, John Fogerty and Wynonna Judd, ensuing credits include, Bob Dylan's, Grammy Award winning, Time Out of Mind (1997).

According to AllMusic, the early credit for the Etta Britt stage name is on Paul Metsa's, Whistling Past the Graveyard (1993). At some point, Melissa's sister had called the studio, asking to speak with Etta, Bob wrote the name "Etta Britt" on a track-sheet and the name combination later became Melissa's stage-name.

Never giving up on her singing career, Britt had developed a soulful blues style as a soloist, slightly outside of the Nashville, country music, genre. Etta's talent had been noted by Sandy Knox while working on Knox', Pushin' 40, Never Married, No Kids (2000); in 2012, the two had a chance encounter at a writers-night event. Knox, a songwriter with Grammy Award nominated works, heard Etta's compositions during her stage performance earlier that evening and invited her to lunch. Britt had prepared for the lunch, which also included music industry veteran Katie Gillon, with the expectation of discussing a deal on a song, not a recording contract.

Britt's record deal, signed at age 53, and a well received freshman album, Out of the Shadows (2012), hitting the Living Blues Magazine's chart at #20, attracted the attention of Marlo Thomas at the Huffington Post who writes: "This story is about a woman who sacrificed the spotlight to help her family survive, and has been given the chance to take center stage with her very own record deal more than 20 years later!"  The NBC Today Show ran a feature story on August 25, 2012, covering highlights of the Huffington Post article, "Out Of The Shadows - Mom Signs Record Deal At 55", and includes video from an opening performance for Delbert McClinton at B.B. King's New York on July 27, 2012.

In 2013, Britt is a featured artist on  B. J. Thomas', The Living Room Sessions, singing a duet with Thomas on an unplugged arrangement of "New Looks from an Old Lover".
In Nov 2019, Britt played guitar with Bob Dylan's touring band.

Solo albums

Out of the Shadows (2012 LP)

Reception

Discography

 Etta Britt is also published under the names, Melissa Dean and Melissa Britt.

Awards

|+ Country Music Association
|-
| 1979
| Dave & Sugar
| Vocal Group of the Year
| 
| Dave Rowland, Sue Powell, Etta Britt

References

External links
 
 

Living people
Singer-songwriters from Kentucky
Musicians from Louisville, Kentucky
American blues singers
American rhythm and blues singers
American gospel singers
American women singer-songwriters
People from Lancaster, Kentucky
Blues musicians from Kentucky
Fern Creek High School alumni
Singers from Kentucky
Kentucky women musicians
21st-century American women singers
Year of birth missing (living people)